Home and Away is an Australian television soap opera. It was first broadcast on the Seven Network on 17 January 1988. The following is a list of characters that appeared in 2019, by order of first appearance. All characters are introduced by the soap's executive producer, Lucy Addario. The 32nd season of Home and Away began airing from 18 February 2019. Mackenzie Booth was introduced in June, along with Ian and Wendy Shaw. August saw the debuts of Alex Neilson and Teresa Masterson. Jade Lennox made her first appearance in October. Ari Parata was introduced in November.

Mackenzie Booth

Mackenzie Booth, played by Emily Weir, made her first appearance on 13 June 2019. Weir's involvement in the show had been made public months in advance due to paparazzi publishing photographs of her filming at Palm Beach. A reporter from Soap World even guessed that the character was named MacKenzie Booth and would be likely be the half-sister of established character Dean Thompson (Patrick O'Connor). Weir's casting and character details were officially announced on 10 June. Weir was attending an audition for another acting job when her agent called to inform her that she had won the role of Mackenzie. She commented, "I just screamed and started running around like a mad woman. It was such an overwhelming feeling; a dream come true." Mackenzie is the new owner of Summer Bay restaurant Salt. Describing her character, Weir said "Mackenzie is a very fierce and independent, smart woman. We don't really know what her motivation is for coming to the Bay – there is quite an element of mystery there." Jackie Brygel of New Idea also noted that buying the restaurant does not seem like Mackenzie's only reason for moving to the Bay, and dubbed the character "mysterious" and "fiery". On 20 June, it was officially revealed that Mackenzie is Dean's half-sister.

Ian and Wendy Shaw

Ian Shaw, played by Frankie J. Holden, and Wendy Shaw, played by Amanda Muggleton, made their first appearances on 27 June 2019. Of his casting, Holden stated "The role came about like everything seems to come about for me – someone, somewhere thought it would be a good idea to get me involved in the show." He also joked that he was offered the role because he had played a farmer on A Place to Call Home for six years, and the producers might have thought he seemed "like a bloke off the land". Muggleton said she was "thrilled" to be cast in Home and Away, adding "Thirty years was a long time to wait, but it was worth it! The crew, cast and creatives are so established and professional – it was made so easy." Ian and Wendy are Robbo's (Jake Ryan) parents. He brings his fiancée Jasmine Delaney (Sam Frost) to visit them at the family farm. However, Wendy is "protective" of her son and tells Jasmine that she does not approve of her marrying Robbo. Ian also shares his concerns with Robbo, and he and Wendy later tell him that they want him to move back to the farm.

Robbo visits his parents at their farm to introduce them to his fiancée Jasmine Delaney. Jasmine gives Ian and Wendy an invitation to their wedding, which she had wanted to personally deliver. Wendy asks Jasmine how she met Robbo, and how she feels about him having a child with Tori Morgan (Penny McNamee). Ian makes it clear that he is not happy about the baby, believing that Robbo was tricked into fatherhood. Robbo and Ian go off to do some work on the farm, leaving Jasmine alone with Wendy, who tells her that she and Ian do not approve of her or the impending marriage. Jasmine tries to reassure Wendy that she will not hurt Robbo again, after lying to him about Tori and the baby, leading to their break up. Robbo also realises that Ian has a problem with his relationship with Jasmine. Robbo tells his parents that he loves Jasmine and either they get on board, or they are leaving. Wendy and Ian talk, and deciding to accept the situation, they offer to cook a roast dinner and make up the spare room for Jasmine. They do not attend the wedding due to car trouble.

Months later, Ian and Wendy come to Summer Bay to meet their granddaughter Grace Morgan for the first time. They disapprove of Robbo's living situation, and later ask him and Jasmine to move to the countryside and raise Grace on the farm. Ian talks with Jasmine, who refuses to put any pressure on Robbo, while Wendy talks with her son, who accepts their offer. Robbo and Jasmine inform Wendy and Ian that they will move to the farm in four weeks time, after the trial of the Ouroboros gang is over. However, when Tori wakes from her coma, the couple change their plans. Shortly after, Wendy and Ian learn that Robbo has died. They return to the Bay for his funeral. Wendy helps Jasmine pick out a suit for Robbo to wear and some photos to be placed in the casket. Jasmine brings the couple to meet Tori for the first time and see Grace. Ian gives a eulogy at the funeral and tells the mourners a story about Robbo and his friend Lance Salisbury (Angus McLaren), whose father is in attendance. Wendy comforts Ian when he breaks down. At the wake, Wendy tells Jasmine that she is welcome at the farm any time, while Tori says that she will make sure that Grace knows all about her father. Ian thanks everyone for looking after their son during his time in the Bay, and the couple leave.

Wendy returns to the Bay after Jasmine informs her and Ian that she is pregnant. She spends time with Grace, and tells Tori that she does not need to attend Jasmine's scan, but Jasmine says that she wants Tori there as they are family. As the scan proceeds, Tori and Jasmine realise that there is no baby. Wendy asks how a woman can have all the symptoms but not be pregnant, and briefly wonders if Jasmine made it up, but Jasmine tells her the pregnancy test was positive. Tori confirms that Jasmine experienced a phantom pregnancy because of her grief at Robbo's death. Wendy later comforts Jasmine and tells her that they need to concentrate on Grace to get them through, before leaving for home. Weeks later, Jasmine shows up at the farm and stays with Ian and Wendy. She does not tell them why she has left the Bay and helps out around the farm. Her friends Irene Roberts (Lynne McGranger) and Colby Thorne (Tim Frankin) come to the farm and tell Ian and Wendy about Jasmine's recent behaviour towards Grace and Tori. Wendy and Ian agree that Jasmine needs some help and tell her that she should accept Irene and Colby's support. They also tell Jasmine that she cannot stay with them permanently because of the AVO against her, which could see them lose access to Grace while she is there. Jasmine agrees to return to the Bay and the Shaws say goodbye to her. In 2022 Wendy has a heart attack so Jasmine goes to the farm to help out and later decides to stay there permanently.

Alex Neilson

Alex Neilson, played by Zoe Ventoura, made her first appearance on 22 August 2019. Ventoura's casting and character details were announced on 8 April 2019, a week after she began filming. Ventoura was living in Los Angeles when she was contacted by Home and Away producers about the role. She recalled, "I was sent the character information and asked if I was interested. I immediately loved the character – that's what got me in. She's strong and bold and smart and compelling. I loved how they have created her and written her on the page, and the storyline they have planned for her. It just seemed like a no-brainer."

Alex is Summer Bay's new doctor and head of emergency, who takes over the position while Tori Morgan (Penny McNamee) takes maternity leave. Having played a nurse on Packed to the Rafters, Ventoura relished the chance to play a doctor. She admitted that she was nervous about the medical terms, but she was looking forward to the challenge and wanted to do the role justice. She revealed that her first day took place on the hospital set and described it as "a real baptism of fire, a really hectic, crazy trauma situation" that her character is in control of. Ventoura described her character as "a complex woman with a lot of layers", while Jackie Brygel of New Idea said Alex has "a fabulously intriguing past". Brygel also said that Alex may be involved in a romance during her time in the Bay.

On her first day in charge of the Northern Districts Hospital ED, Alex attempts to treat a man who has been tortured by the Ouroboros gang, and learns that nurse Jasmine Delaney (Sam Frost) has to be accompanied an AFP officer. She questions whether the hospital is safe for Jasmine, and tells her that she has a duty of care to the other staff and patients. She later catches her having lunch with Willow Harris (Sarah Roberts) in an empty room. Willow offers Alex a free personal training session at the local gym, which she accepts. Alex treats Raffy Morrison (Olivia Deeble) after she suffers an epileptic seizure. She tells Raffy that she too suffers from epilepsy and once suffered a seizure during an HSC exam. Raffy is inspired to try alternative treatments for her condition. Alex uses hypnotherapy to help Jasmine's husband Robbo (Jake Ryan) recover his lost memories. While he is under, Robbo attacks Alex and pins her against the wall. Mason Morgan (Orpheus Pledger) tries to help her and Robbo snaps out of it and leaves, but Alex persuades him to try again. Raffy talks with Alex when she suffers another seizure and mentions that Mason ran an illegal CBD oil trial for her. Alex tells Mason that she has put in a good word for his internship at Northern Districts. When he later tries flirting with her, Alex tells him that she is gay. Alex continues her PT sessions with Willow and they grow close. She also finds a new medicinal marijuana trial for Raffy and treats Scott Larkin (Trent Baines) when he is shot. Willow later thanks Alex for her support and tells her that she feels like she has known her for years, which leads Alex to kiss Willow.

Teresa Masterson

Teresa Masterson, played by Simone McAullay, made her first appearance on 28 August 2019. McAullay previously appeared in the serial as Vivian Anderson in 2007. She told a New Idea writer that she received the offer to play Teresa "out of the blue." She explained, "I've certainly come to a place now where I'm a lot more interested in the full spectrum of characters and that's why, when this role came up, I thought, 'Brilliant! I'd love to!'" McAullay also said that her character "has a lot of things going on", so she was happy to accept the part. Teresa is an activist who befriends Irene Roberts (Lynne McGranger) at a support group. A New Idea wrote "Simone is undoubtedly set to leave a truly memorable mark on the Bay."

Teresa is a member of a victims support group that Irene Roberts attends. She records a video about her sexual assault for Leah Patterson's (Ada Nicodemou) blog, which Irene watches in preparation for her trial for attacking Tommy O'Reilly (Adam Sollis). Teresa later arranges a supportive protest outside the courthouse during Irene's trial. She comes to Summer Bay to tell Irene and Leah about the next part of the plan, which involves Irene telling her story to the media. Irene refuses, as it may affect her case. Teresa reacts badly saying that Irene was more than happy with the group's support, but is not willing to give anything back. Leah later meets with Teresa and offers to take up her cause on her blog. Teresa continues to support Irene as her verdict comes in. After learning that Tommy has launched a civil suit against Irene, Teresa offers her help to fight it. She suggests that they publicly shame Tommy, and put enough pressure on him so he drops the case. Irene and Leah tell Teresa that they need to be careful, but she counters that Tommy could still go free, and suggests they make posters and online comments calling Tommy a rapist.

Teresa later finds Irene on the beach and warns her about trusting Leah, as she has been blocked from her website. Teresa reiterates that Tommy is going to walk free and wants to take action. Irene tells Teresa that she is grateful for her help, but she needs to obey the law so her hands are tied. Tommy's victim Bella Nixon (Courtney Miller) thanks Teresa for her protesting. The following day, Teresa turns up at the pier covered in blood and tells Irene and Bella that her hands were not tied, so she fixed it. Bella's brother Constable Colby Thorne (Tim Franklin) comes over and Teresa says she stopped Tommy for Irene and Bella. He takes her to the station, where she admits to fatally stabbing Tommy at his rehab centre. While visiting Teresa, Irene says she cannot condone her actions, while Leah mentions that Bella and the other girls will not get justice now. Teresa tells them that she does not regret what she has done.

Jade Lennox

Jade Lennox, played by Mia Morrissey, made her first appearance on 22 October 2019. The character and Morrissey's casting was announced shortly before her first scenes aired. Morrissey said it had been "a lifelong dream" of hers to appear on the serial, as she used to live near the set when she was younger and she would walk to it with her father. Morrissey planned to use her role to challenge beauty standards, as she does not fit the usual body types seen on the show. She explained, "Hopefully if someone sees someone like me who is a curvy size 10, who is incredibly healthy and fit, but I have stretch marks, if someone sees me in a bikini maybe they'll feel ok about themselves."

Jade is a backpacker and was initially introduced as a love rival for Ziggy Astoni (Sophie Dillman). Jade flirts with Ziggy's boyfriend Dean Thompson (Patrick O'Connor) when she takes surf lessons from him, causing tension between him and Ziggy, who soon tells Jade to back off. Ryder Jackson (Lukas Radovich) is attracted to Jade, so he befriends her and helps her secure employment at local restaurant, Salt. Of her character's reaction to Ryder, Morrissey stated: "Ryder is a bit like a puppy dog as far as Jade' concerned – and Jade loves all the attention and the fact that she has this power over Ryder. Jade's quite flippant and moves on as easily in her love life as she does in her travels." The character made her last appearance on 6 February 2020, after being driven out of Summer Bay by Ryder, whom she falsely blamed for uploading a sex tape of them to the internet. Morrissey admitted that she found it hard to play out Jade's actions at times, saying "Sometimes it was kinda hard. I mean, I know it's 'make believe'. But as an actor it's kinda your job to invest in your character and when your character and their actions go so against your own set of moral values it is... yeah... hard."

While attending surf lessons in Summer Bay, Jade flirts with her instructor Dean Thompson. She soon stops when she meets his girlfriend Ziggy Astoni.  Jade attracts the attention of Ryder Jackson and she gets a job alongside him at Salt. Jade and Ryder go out on a date, and she warns his aunt Roo Stewart to back off when Roo comes to invite her to dinner. Ryder  later loses his virginity to Jade, and she uses his infatuation with her to her advantage at work. When Ryder catches her taking money form the till at Salt, she tells him that she was just collecting her tips. Ryder pays the money back when their boss Mackenzie Booth (Emily Weir) notices the till is $50 down. Jade invites Ryder back to her caravan, but she asks him to leave in the morning when he questions her about taking the money. Ryder persists in asking Jade why she took the money and she tells him that her mother lost her job, so she took the money to help out her family. Ryder gets Jade a rent extension from his grandfather, but she continues to pocket money from Salt. When Ryder catches her stealing, he urges her to tell Mackenzie, but she refuses, so he does it for her and she is arrested. Upon her release, she apologises to Ryder and they have sex in her caravan, which she films. 

Jade uploads the video to the internet using Ryder's phone and accuses Ryder of doing it without her consent, resulting in him being questioned and later charged by the police. Ryder confronts Jade, who refuses to take responsibility for her actions and she convinces Mackenzie and Bella Nixon (Courtney Miller) that he is guilty. Jade later provokes Ryder when they met on the beach and she records him talking to her. Nikau Parata (Kawakawa Fox-Reo) comes to her aid and warns Ryder to back off. He and Jade have a drink together and she tells him about the sex tape. Nikau later meets Jade for dinner and he tells her that he fought with Ryder. They kiss and continue spending time together. Jade is rude to Gemma Parata (Bree Peters) when she comes to Salt to drop off her CV, and Nikau reveals that Gemma is his mother. Jade tries to seduce Nikau in the store cupboard, but he stops her, finds her phone, which is set up to record them together, and takes it. He later tells her that he gave it to Ryder, and Jade goes to the Stewart house, where Ryder's grandfather is getting married. Ryder and Nikau find her searching for it and stop her, the resulting confrontation brings attention to them from the wedding guests, thus exposing Jade's lies to everyone. Ryder and Alf Stewart (Ray Meagher) tell Jade to leave town or else they will call the police on her with all the evidence they have. Realising that she has no choice and that all evidence is now pointed against her, Jade leaves the Bay in defeat.

Ari Parata

Ari Parata, played by Rob Kipa-Williams, made his first appearance on 27 November 2019. Kipa-Williams was planning to quit acting and he had just finished training to be an insurance salesman when he received the role. He was initially contracted for three years, and he began filming in June 2019. Ari is the head of a Māori family from New Zealand. Ethan Browne plays Ari's brother Tane Parata and Kawakawa Fox-Reo was cast as his nephew Nikau Parata.

Ari is among several characters caught up in a hostage situation at the local hospital in the show's 2019 season finale. Kipa-Williams explained that Ari ends up in the hospital after injuring himself at a nearby construction site. He helps Marilyn Chambers (Emily Symons) when she has a panic attack. Kipa-Williams commented, "I comfort her the way that I can, but for Ari, it's not his first rodeo when it comes to having danger around him." After the scenes aired, Kipa-Williams wrote a post in character on his social media. He confirmed that Ari's full name is Ariki Wiremu Parata and that he was born in New Zealand, before moving to Australia. He continued, "I've had a few challenges and those challenges brought me to Summer Bay... I love my whanau (family), I'll do anything for them, but never cross me".

Ari takes the blame for Matthew Montgomery's (James Sweeny) murder in order to protect his fiancée Mia Anderson (Anna Samson) and her daughter Chloe Anderson (Sam Barrett). In an episode broadcast on 3 March 2022, Ari was informed that he had appendix cancer, which had spread to the abdomen. He opted not have regular surgeries as he wanted to die on his terms. Daniel Kilkelly of Digital Spy reported that rumours of Kipa-Williams' exit from the show had been circulating for months, although Home and Away had not officially confirmed his departure. The character's on-screen death aired on 7 March. Kipa-Williams took to his Instagram account after his final scenes aired to thank the show's cast, crew, and fans for their messages and support. He added "This Iconic Ozzie TV show took risks. I'm honoured to have co-created Māori cultural storylines, and will forever be proud of those scenes that made it to screen.. it was true teamwork.. My hope is this opens the door for more diversity. Thank you for everything Ariki Wiremu Parata, you taught me a lot. I'm gonna miss you."

Others

References

External links
Characters and cast at the Official AU Home and Away website
Characters and cast at the Internet Movie Database

, 2019
, Home and Away
2019 in Australian television